Du Val is a surname. Notable people with the surname include:

 Patrick du Val (1903–1987), British mathematician
 Peter Du Val (1767–1851), the son of Jean Du Val and Marie Piton
 Pierre Nicolas Camille Jacquelin du Val (1828–1862), French entomologist

See also
 Duvale